David M. Kerner (born August 24, 1983) is the former county mayor of, and currently a county commissioner for, Palm Beach County and a former Democratic member of the Florida House of Representatives. He is a former police officer, and then, special prosecutor. He also is a practicing complex litigation trial attorney in West Palm Beach, Florida, and is known as a leader on issues relating to constitutional law, criminal law, judicial issues, and law enforcement issues. He lives in Lake Worth Beach, and is married to Jacqueline Kerner.

Early life, education, and career 
Kerner was born and raised in Lake Worth Beach, Florida, and attended Suncoast Community High School, where he graduated in 2002. Afterwards, he moved to Gainesville, where he attended the University of Florida, was a member of Beta Theta Pi (Pledge Class - Fall 2003), graduating with a degree in political science and criminology in 2006. Simultaneously, he enrolled in the Police Academy at Santa Fe Community College, where he received his certification as a police officer in 2004. He then worked as a police officer in Alachua from 2004 to 2007, while studying full-time at the University of Florida. Kerner was named "Police Officer of the Year" in 2006 and served as the Department Representative to the Fraternal Order of Police, Lodge 62. In 2007, Kerner then attended the University of Florida College of Law, graduating with his law degree in 2010. While in law school, and until his election to the Florida House of Representatives, he served as a part-time police officer with the Florida Wildlife Commission, working as a marine and woodland/resource patrol officer. While at the University of Florida, Kerner held several leadership and service positions, including serving as the Chief Justice of the UF Supreme Court, Chairman of the 2010 UF Student Government Constitutional Revision Commission, and Vice-President of the law school. While in law school at the University of Florida, Kerner was inducted into Florida Blue Key, a preeminent leadership group.

Upon becoming a member of the Florida Bar, he was selected to serve as a Special Prosecutor for the Palm Beach County State's Attorney.  He then began work as a civil litigation attorney for Schuler, Halvorson, Weisser, Zoeller & Overbeck, P.A., where he practices wrongful death, personal injury, and class action law for plaintiffs. Kerner has continued to serve as a practicing trial and complex litigation attorney while serving in the Florida House of Representatives. He has served as lead counsel in several state-wide class action cases challenging the constitutionality of red light camera ordinances. He has appeared before the Florida Supreme Court in the landmark state preemption red light camera case of Masone v. City of Aventura, 147 So.3d 492 (Fla. 2014), and won.

Florida House of Representatives
In 2012, after the Florida House of Representatives districts were redrawn, Kerner opted to run in the newly created 87th District. While the 87th District is 52% Hispanic, it is also where Kerner was born and raised, and had resided except for his time in college, on the police force, and while in law school. He faced Mike Rios in the Democratic primary, whom he easily defeated with 68% of the vote. Kerner was unopposed in the general election, and was sworn into his first term.

Kerner has emerged as the most effective Democratic lawmaker in the Florida House of Representatives since his election. He has sponsored fourteen bills that have been passed into law, and has consistently led the Democratic opposition against several high-profile National Rifle Association pushed gun bills.

Ideology and policy preferences 
Rep. Dave Kerner has been identified as conservative democrat, southern democrat, and bi-partisan, among other labels. He has primarily exhibited a consistent voting record, while leading floor debate against bills that could typically be seen as "conservative" in ideology, but "misguided" in their conservative principles. Recent examples include bills pushed by the National Rifle Association advocating open carrying of firearms and the carrying of firearms on college campuses. Other examples include "Protection Against Refugee" type legislation, legislation directed specifically against the LGBT community, and anti-abortion legislation. Kerner has publicly reprimanded other lawmakers for voting for bills that are "clearly" unconstitutional, and appears to regard constitutionality as a greater priority than any particular policy objective.

In the 2022 Florida gubernatorial election, Kerner endorsed the Republican incumbent Ron DeSantis over his Democratic challenger, former governor Charlie Crist.

Major policy positions and legislation
Kerner has been identified as the most effective Democratic lawmaker in the Florida House of Representatives since his election. He has sponsored eleven bills that have been passed into law, and has consistently led the Democratic opposition against several high-profile National Rifle Association pushed gun bills.

Kerner has emerged as a leader in combating human trafficking, and has filed and passed several related bills which have become law. While serving in the legislature, Kerner sponsored HB 7005; legislation that aimed to "stem prostitution and human sex trafficking" in the state's massage parlors, which are being used in some instances as fronts for illegal activity, by making it "a first degree misdemeanor for a person to operate a massage establishment between the hours of midnight and 5 a.m. and to use the massage business as a domicile."

In an unusual victory, Kerner was able to maneuver House Bill 369 through both the Florida House of Representatives and the Florida Senate four times in one session during the 2015 legislative session. The law (HB 369), aimed at raising awareness about human trafficking, mandates National Human Trafficking Hotline signs to be posted in a wide range of places, including rest areas, turnpike service plazas, weigh stations, welcome centers, airports and strip clubs. The legislation was co-sponsored by Republican Senator Jack Latvala.

He also authored legislation with State Senator Joseph Abruzzo that would "sever the parental rights of a rapist if a child is conceived as a result of the attack," as, in some cases, rapists could sue for custody of children that were the products of the rapes that they committed.

In addition, he also sponsored the "Timely Justice Act," which speeds up executions for inmates on death row. Specifically, the law requires the governor to sign a death warrant for a defendant within 30 days of a review of a capital conviction by the State Supreme Court, and the state is required carry out the execution within 180 days of the warrant.

Kerner was re-elected to his second term in the legislature in 2014 without opposition.

National Rifle Association opposition and controversy
Kerner has been a vocal opponent of many National Rifle Association sponsored legislation, which came as a surprise considering Kerner's background as a police officer, his background in firearms, and his background as an avid hunter and sportsman.

During the 2016 legislative session, Kerner was responsible (in part) for the gutting, and ultimate killing, of House Bill 163. House Bill 163 would have imposed certain penalties on the State Attorney for "Stand Your Ground" related prosecution, and was a priority bill of the Florida chapter of the National Rifle Association.

In a most dramatic fashion, Kerner sponsored two late amendments in the Criminal Justice Subcommittee, to the frustration and anger of the bill sponsor, Rep. Charles Baxley. This set up the unique posture of a minority Member publicly challenging a majority Chairman in public. During the bill presentation, the bill sponsor publicly accused Kerner of filing the amendments behind his back and without the courtesy of consulting with him. Baxley demanded during the bill hearing that Kerner withdraw his amendments out of legislative courtesy, and Kerner responded that he "could not let legislative courtesy get in the way of bad public policy." To the surprise of the Florida political world, both amendments were adopted by a bi-partisan vote, and the bill was then killed on a bi-partisan vote shortly thereafter.

Following the killing of the bill, the National Rifle Association publicly condemned the actions of the legislators involved, and began an email campaign against those involved. Kerner was later named "Winner of the Week" by the Tampa Tribune for his successful efforts in killing the National Rifle Association bill.

References

External links
Florida House of Representatives - Dave Kerner
Kerner for State House

1983 births
Living people
Members of the Florida House of Representatives
People from Lake Worth Beach, Florida